Aphrodisias, also known as Aphrodisia (Ἀφροδισία), was a town in the south of ancient Laconia, on the Boeatic Gulf, said to have been founded by Aeneas.

Its site is located near the modern Megali Spilia.

References

Populated places in ancient Laconia
Former populated places in Greece